The 1992 United States presidential election in Oklahoma took place on November 3, 1992, as part of the 1992 United States presidential election. Voters chose eight representatives, or electors to the Electoral College, who voted for president and vice president.

Oklahoma was won by incumbent President George H. W. Bush (R-Texas) with 42.65 percent of the popular vote over Governor Bill Clinton (D-Arkansas) with 34.02 percent. Businessman Ross Perot (I-Texas) finished in third, with 23.01 percent of the popular vote. Clinton ultimately won the national vote, defeating both incumbent President Bush and Perot. , this is the last election in which Beckham County, Delaware County, Washita County, and Stephens County voted for a Democratic presidential candidate. This was the first time that the Democrats won the White House without Jackson County and the first time since Oklahoma statehood that a losing Republican managed to carry any of the 10 counties bordering the Red River. This is the most recent time that a Democrat has carried a majority of Oklahoma's counties in a presidential election.

Results

Results by county

Slates of Electors
Democrat: Earl E. Abernathy, Carl Albert, Obera Bergdall, Carolyn Crump, Lynn D. Hall, Glorine Henley, Grace Hudlin, Pete White

Republican: Jana Barker, Linda Blaylock, Ed Calhoon, Betty Casey, Allan Goodbary, Warren Roberts, Paul Thornbrugh, Dorothy Zumwalt,

Libertarian: Michael Alan Clem, Phillip R. Denney, Anne Hill Fruits, Randy Lee Gann, Vanessa C. McNeill, Brian J. Sullivan, David J. Walker, Paul O. Woodward

Independent: Pat Bigelow, Kathryn Fanning, Joe D. Sewell, A. D. Hollingsworth, A. R. Posey, John Sanders, Robert T. Jones, Jeanie Wolfgram

See also
 United States presidential elections in Oklahoma
 Presidency of Bill Clinton

Notes

References

Oklahoma
1992
1992 Oklahoma elections